In physics, horror vacui, or plenism, commonly stated as "nature abhors a vacuum", is a postulate attributed to Aristotle, who articulated a belief, later criticized by the atomism of Epicurus and Lucretius, that nature contains no vacuums because the denser surrounding material continuum would immediately fill the rarity of an incipient void. He also argued against the void in a more abstract sense (as "separable"), for example, that by definition a void (equivocally?) itself, is nothing, and following Plato, nothing cannot rightly be said to exist. Furthermore, insofar as it would be featureless, it could neither be encountered by the senses, nor could its supposition lend additional explanatory power. Hero of Alexandria challenged the theory in the first century AD, but his attempts to create an artificial vacuum failed. The theory was debated in the context of 17th-century fluid mechanics, by Thomas Hobbes and Robert Boyle, among others, and through the early 18th century by Sir Isaac Newton and Gottfried Leibniz.

Origin

Etymology
Plenism means "fullness", from Latin plēnum, English "plenty", cognate via Proto-Indo-European to "full". In Ancient Greek, the term for the void is τὸ κενόν (to kenón).

History
The idea was restated as "Natura abhorret vacuum" by François Rabelais in his series of books titled Gargantua and Pantagruel in the 1530s. The theory was supported and restated by Galileo Galilei in the early 17th century as "Resistenza del vacuo". Galileo was surprised by the fact that water could not rise above a certain level in an aspiration tube in his suction pump, leading him to conclude that there is a limit to the phenomenon. René Descartes proposed a plenic interpretation of atomism to eliminate the void, which he considered incompatible with his concept of space. The theory was rejected by later scientists, such as Galileo's pupil Evangelista Torricelli, who repeated his experiment with mercury. Blaise Pascal successfully repeated Galileo's and Torricelli's experiment and foresaw no reason why a perfect vacuum could not be achieved in principle. Scottish philosopher Thomas Carlyle mentioned Pascal's experiment in the Edinburgh Encyclopædia in an 1823 article titled "Pascal".

James Clerk Maxwell subscribed to this philosophy when he argued forcefully for the existence of the luminiferous aether in his 1861 electromagnetic theory of light.

See also
Casimir effect
Lamb shift
Spontaneous emission
Quantum fluctuation
Quantum  vacuum state
QCD vacuum
QED vacuum
Vacuum
Vacuum permittivity
Vacuum Rabi oscillation
Inertia

References

Obsolete theories in physics
Vacuum

de:Horror vacui